Pound System is a Melbourne-based electronica outfit. Both members also work as producers, working with Rocket Science, Screamfeeder and Sarah McLeod and have remixed song by many artists such as 28 Days, Spiderbait, Regurgitator, Kylie Minogue and Josh Abrahams. Their 2001 album You Know It Makes Sense features appearances by Katie Noonan and Spiderbait's Whit.

Discography
 The Counterfeit Bootleg
 Get Amongst It
 You Know It Makes Sense (2001)

References

Australian electronic musicians
Musical groups from Melbourne